Peter C. Thibeaux (born October 3, 1961) is a retired American professional basketball small forward who played two season in the National Basketball Association (NBA) as a member of the Golden State Warriors. He was drafted by the Warriors in the fourth round (77 pick overall) from Saint Mary's College of California.

In the 1989–90 season, Thibeaux played in the Dutch Eredivisie for EBBC Den Bosch.

References

External links

1961 births
Living people
American expatriate basketball people in France
American expatriate basketball people in Italy
American expatriate basketball people in the Netherlands
American men's basketball players
Basketball players from Los Angeles
Basketball players from Oakland, California
Cedar Rapids Silver Bullets players
Golden State Warriors draft picks
Golden State Warriors players
Louisville Catbirds players
Saint Mary's Gaels men's basketball players
Small forwards
Tulsa Fast Breakers players
Heroes Den Bosch players